Zelleria oleastrella is a moth of the family Yponomeutidae. It is found in southern Europe and Turkey.

The wingspan is 12–15 mm. There are five overlapping generations per year with adults on wing year round, but mostly from May to November.

The larvae feed on olive (Olea europaea) and possibly Russian olive (Elaeagnus angustifolia). They usually bore into the terminal buds of their host plant, but may also inhabit the tips of young shoots. Pupation takes place beneath a slight silken web.

References

External links
 Zelleria oleastrella at UKmoths

Yponomeutidae
Moths described in 1864
Moths of Europe
Taxa named by Pierre Millière